Borislav "Mihiz" Mihajlović (17 October 1922 – 15 December 1997) was a Serbian writer and literary critic.

He was one of the leaders of the Committee for the Protection of Artistic Freedom.

A street in Dorćol is named after him.

Selected works
 Pesme, 1947
 Ogledi, 1951
 Od istog čitaoca, 1956
 Srpski pesnici između dva rata, 1956
 Književni razgovori, 1971
 Izdajnici, 1986
 Portreti, 1988
 Autobiografija o drugima, 1990
 Autobiografija o drugima – druga knjiga, 1993
 Banović Strahinja, drama
 Komanant Sajler, drama
 Kraljević Marko, drama
 Optuženi Pera Todorović, drama

Screenplays
 Korespondencija
 Dorotej
 Ranjeni orao
 Derviš i smrt
 Silom otac
 Roj
 Orlovi rano lete
 Put oko sveta
 Dve noći u jednom danu
 Branko Radičević

References

External links
 

1922 births
1997 deaths
People from Irig, Serbia
Serbian writers
Serbian screenwriters
Male screenwriters
Serbian dramatists and playwrights
Serbian literary critics
Literary critics of Serbian
Serbian male poets
Serbian anti-communists
Serbian male essayists
University of Belgrade Faculty of Philosophy alumni
20th-century screenwriters
Yugoslav writers